DD Punjabi  is a state-owned Punjabi language TV channel, started in 1998, which is produced and telecasted from Doordarshan Kendra Jalandhar in Indian Punjab.

History
DD Punjabi Channel was launched in 1998, and it became a 24-hour service within two years. Numerous Punjabi viewers residing in different parts of India watch the cultural programmes broadcast on DD Punjabi with interest across the state and by a number of Punjabi viewers residing in different parts of India. In its terrestrial mode DD Punjabi has near 100 per cent reach in the State of Punjab. These programmes enlighten the viewers in cultivating modern social modes. Doordarshan Kendra, Jalandhar is the hub of DD Punjabi productions.

Programming 

 Lafafi
 Parchhaven

See also
 List of programs broadcast by DD National
 All India Radio
 Ministry of Information and Broadcasting
 DD Direct Plus
 List of South Asian television channels by country

References

External links
 DD Punjabi's Web site
 Doordarshan Official Internet site
 Doordarshan news site
 An article at PFC
 Live Streaming

Doordarshan
Punjabi-language television channels in India
Foreign television channels broadcasting in the United Kingdom
Television channels and stations established in 1992
Indian direct broadcast satellite services
Mass media in Punjab, India
Jalandhar
1992 establishments in Punjab, India